Michael Ramsay Bellhouse (born 11 October 1976) is a former English cricketer.  Bellhouse was a right-handed batsman who bowled right-arm fast-medium.  He was born in Wandsworth, London.

Bellhouse made his debut for Oxfordshire in the 1997 MCCA Knockout Trophy against Bedfordshire.  Bellhouse played Minor counties cricket for Oxfordshire from 1997 to 2001, which included 13 Minor Counties Championship matches and 3 MCCA Knockout Trophy matches.  He made his List A debut against Wales Minor Counties in the 2000 NatWest Trophy.  He played his second and final List A match against Huntingdonshire in the 2001 Cheltenham & Gloucester Trophy.  In his 2 List A matches he scored 33 runs at a batting average of 16.50, with a high score of 24.  With the ball he bowled 18 wicket-less overs.

He also played Second XI cricket for the Middlesex Second XI in 1999.

References

External links
Michael Bellhouse at ESPNcricinfo
Michael Bellhouse at CricketArchive

1976 births
Living people
People from Wandsworth
Cricketers from Greater London
English cricketers
Oxfordshire cricketers